Mykhailivka is a village in Horlivka Raion of Donetsk Oblast of eastern Ukraine, at 36.9 km NNE from the centre of Donetsk city.

The village was taken under control of pro-Russian forces during the War in Donbass, that started in 2014.

Demographics
Native language as of the Ukrainian Census of 2001:
Ukrainian 20.10%
Russian 79.90%

References

Villages in Horlivka Raion